John Jacob (J.J.) Malone (August 20, 1935 – February 20, 2004) was an American West Coast blues, electric blues and soul blues guitarist, singer and keyboardist. His best-known recordings were "It's a Shame" and "Danger Zone". Malone was a member of the Rhythm Rockers, and he  variously worked with other musicians, such as Troyce Key, Jill Baxter, Al Green, Joe Simon, Etta James, Scott McKenzie and Frankie Lee.

Biography
Malone was born in Pete's Corner, Alabama. He sang in his local church and learned to play the harmonica, guitar and piano. After moving to California, he found more regular employment in the music industry and had local hit singles with "It's a Shame", "One Step Away", and "Danger Zone". Malone met the record producer Ray Shanklin and was subsequently employed as a record company executive at Fantasy Records (and its subsidiary Galaxy) in the late 1960s and early 1970s. At Galaxy, Malone worked alongside Little Johnny Taylor, Big Mama Thornton, Sonny Rhodes and Creedence Clearwater Revival. With the singer and guitarist Troyce Key, he bought Eli's Mile High Club, a nightclub in north Oakland, California. In the 1970s, Eli's Mile High acquired a reputation for supporting West Coast blues artists. In 1980s, the duo appeared at the San Francisco Blues Festival.

Malone appeared in conjunction with Key on the albums I've Gotta a New Car (1980, Red Lightnin' Records), and Younger Than Yesterday (1981, Red Lightnin'). Malone returned to performing as a solo artist in the 1980s, and continued to record until 2001. He released three solo albums, including Highway 99 (1997).

Malone died of cancer in Hawaii, in February 2004, at the age of 68. He was buried next to his father on March 2, 2004, at Ragland Cemetery in Limestone County, Alabama.

Discography

See also
List of West Coast blues musicians

References

External links 
 Guide to the J.J. Malone Audiovisual Collection, African American Museum & Library at Oakland, Oakland Public Library.

1935 births
2004 deaths
American blues singers
American blues guitarists
American male guitarists
American keyboardists
Electric blues musicians
West Coast blues musicians
Soul-blues musicians
Songwriters from Alabama
Deaths from cancer in Hawaii
20th-century American singers
20th-century American guitarists
Guitarists from Alabama
20th-century American male singers
American male songwriters